St. Mary's High School is a private, Roman Catholic high school in Lynn, Massachusetts. It is located in the Roman Catholic Archdiocese of Boston.

Background
St. Mary's High School was established in 1881 as Saint Mary's Boys High School. A Girl's High School was added later, followed by coeducation. In 1989 the school began a junior high school starting with a 7th grade class only, with an 8th grade class added the following year. The junior high school added a 6th grade class in 2011 after Massachusetts moved to a middle school education model.

St. Mary's incorporated in 2006 as a private school, independent from the Archdiocese of Boston, and instituted a new governance structure with a head of school, principal, and twenty-member Board of Trustees, thus ending its period as a parochial school.

Athletics

St. Mary's teams include:

Baseball (1987, 1988, 2015 State Champions)
Boys Basketball (2000, 2001, 2002, 2012, 2016, 2022 State Champions)
Girls Basketball (2001, 2002, 2011, 2014, 2022 State Champions) (2011, 2014 Co-CCL Champions)
Cheerleading
Crew
Football (2005, 2022 State Champions, 2012, 2016, 2018 State Finalists) 
Boys Golf (2005, 2006, 2017, 2018, 2019 State Champions)                                          
Boys Hockey (2017 State Champions)
Girls Ice Hockey (2005, 2008, 2009, 2010, and 2013 State Champions)
Intramural Basketball (Co-ed)
Boys Lacrosse
Girls Lacrosse
Girls Rugby
Boys Soccer (1988 State Champions, 2018 State Finalists)
Girls Soccer
Softball (2008 Co-CCL Champions, 2008 State Champions)
Swimming (Co-ed) (2008 CCL Champions)
Boys Tennis
Girls Tennis
Track
Volleyball (2006 and 2007 ( Undefeated CCL Champions)

The St. Mary's Girls Ice Hockey team went a perfect 25–0 in 2007/2008. The girls then repeated this feat plus one to go 26–0 in 2008/2009. In addition, they went through the 2009/2010 season undefeated with one tie. The result: 100 consecutive games without a loss over three years before a loss to Hingham in the state semi-finals, and three Massachusetts Division 1 State Titles.

Miscellaneous
The former Girls High School building was demolished in 2005 to make way for the state-of-the-art William F. Connell Center, which provides a library, technology center, chapel, and classrooms.

Students are encouraged to participate in Christian service activities, such as Rachel's Challenge,  Sant' Edigio, and assisting at My Brother's Table, a local food pantry.

Notable alumni

Tony Conigliaro, Major League Baseball player
William F. Connell, Boston businessman and philanthropist, namesake of Boston College's Connell School of Nursing
Tony Fossas, Major League Baseball player
Kevin B. Harrington, President of the Massachusetts State Senate, 1971–1978
Chris Howard, Major League Baseball player
J. Michael Ruane, politician and member of the Massachusetts House of Representatives
Kevin Trudeau, author, infomercial salesman, fraudster

References

External links
 School Website

Catholic secondary schools in Massachusetts
Schools in Lynn, Massachusetts
Educational institutions established in 1881
1881 establishments in Massachusetts